Sanghoi  is a village and union council of Jhelum District in the Punjab Province of Pakistan. It is part of Jhelum Tehsil. and is located at 32°52'0N 73°36'0E with an altitude of 223 metres (734 feet).

References

Populated places in Tehsil Jhelum
Union councils of Jhelum Tehsil